Ivo Baldi Gaburri (27 March 1947 – 11 June 2021) was an Italian-born Peruvian Roman Catholic bishop.

Biography
Baldi Gaburri was born in Città di Castello, Perugia, Italy and was ordained to the priesthood in 1971. He served as the prelate and bishop of the Roman Catholic Diocese of Huaraz, Peru, from 2000 to 2004 and as bishop of the Roman Catholic Diocese of Huarí, Peru, from 2004 until his death.

He died from COVID-19 on 11 June 2021, at age 74 in Huaraz, Ancash, Peru, during the COVID-19 pandemic in Peru.

Notes

1947 births
2021 deaths
Italian Roman Catholic bishops in South America
20th-century Roman Catholic bishops in Peru
21st-century Roman Catholic bishops in Peru
People from Città di Castello
Deaths from the COVID-19 pandemic in Peru
Roman Catholic bishops of Huarí
Roman Catholic bishops of Huaraz